The Colorado Rockies farm system consists of seven Minor League Baseball affiliates across the United States and in the Dominican Republic. Four teams are independently owned, while the Arizona Complex League Rockies and a pair of Dominican Summer League Rockies squads—are owned by the major league club.

The Rockies have been affiliated with the Triple-A Albuquerque Isotopes of the Pacific Coast League since 2015, making it the longest-running active affiliation in the organization among teams not owned by the Rockies. The longest affiliation in the team's history was with the Asheville Tourists from 1994 to 2020. Their newest affiliations began in 2021 with the Single-A Fresno Grizzlies of the California League and the High-A Spokane Indians of the Northwest League.

2021–present
The current structure of Minor League Baseball is the result of an overall contraction of the system beginning with the 2021 season. Class A was reduced to two levels: High-A and Low-A. Low-A was reclassified as Single-A in 2022.

1992–2020
Minor League Baseball operated with six classes from 1990 to 2020. The Class A level was subdivided for a second time with the creation of Class A-Advanced. The Rookie level consisted of domestic and foreign circuits.

References

External links
 Major League Baseball Prospect News: Colorado Rockies
 Baseball-Reference: Colorado Rockies League Affiliations

Minor league affiliates